The Wiener klinische Wochenschrift (subtitled The Central European Journal of Medicine) is a monthly peer-reviewed medical journal that was established in 1888. It is the official organ of three medical societies in Austria: the Österreichische Gesellschaft für Innere Medizin, Österreichischen Kardiologischen Gesellschaft, and Österreichische Gesellschaft für Pneumologie. It is published by Springer Nature and the editor-in-chief is Gerold Stanek (Medical University of Vienna).

Abstracting and indexing
The journal is abstracted and indexed in:

According to the Journal Citation Reports, the journal has a 2018 impact factor of 1.170.

References

External links

General medical journals
Publications established in 1888
Biweekly journals
Multilingual journals
Springer Science+Business Media academic journals